MySims Kingdom is a video game developed by EA Redwood Shores and published by Electronic Arts as a spin-off to Maxis' The Sims franchise for the Nintendo DS and Wii in 2008. MySims Kingdom is a follow-up to MySims, which was released in 2007 and was followed by MySims Party, MySims Racing, MySims Agents and MySims SkyHeroes.

Gameplay

Wii version
The Wii version of MySims Kingdom takes a departure from The Sims franchise and begins with a character living in a run-down kingdom with a king desperate to bring happiness back. The kingdom's Wandoliers, wand-equipped Sims that worked to keep the kingdom in order, have long since retired or moved away and it is up to the player to become the new Wandolier and restore order. The player's job is to rebuild, or remodel, homes and other structures for the characters using scrolls given to them by the islanders, and complete tasks that the islanders assign. Players must collect essences to unlock these scrolls and gain new items from them, and collect "mana" used to create furniture and structures and in return the player is given essences, scrolls, King Points (occasionally) and outfits for their Sim. As the kingdom's happiness increases, new islands are unlocked. To unlock more places, the player runs errands until they collect enough "King Points". A second set of missions are handed out before reaching the end of the game and achieving a special award.

Once the player has collected enough points to have reached King Points Level 5, they unlock the Reward Island which is an island at the top-left of the map for the player to build in as they please. On the Reward Island, the player is given the ability to place Figurines, Essences, and Flowers that have been collected throughout the game. Upon reaching King Points Level 5, the player can then also view the credits whenever they please. The end credits sequence features characters from the various islands dancing to an original song by composer Mark Mothersbaugh. Characters only appear in the end credit sequence if the player completed all of the tasks on their island. This means that the credits sequence can play out differently for different players, depending on how much of the game they completed.

Players can also interact with citizens by doing certain things with them, such as having a picnic. They can also customize characters using the outfits obtained as a reward for performing certain tasks. Some items in the game are interactive such as televisions, stoves, computers, video games, etc. Unlike other games in The Sims franchise, the player's Sim does not have needs or wants, although eating and sleep is optional.

In the Nintendo Wii version of MySims Kingdom, the Nunchuk is used for direct movement and the Wii Remote used for object moving and building. Players can also use the Wii Remote to go fishing at the fishing spot located around every island. Shaking the Wii Remote is used to chop down trees or go mining to gain different essences. Occasionally islanders will ask the player to explore the Kingdom collecting certain things such as fish, figurines and armor.

Nintendo DS
In the Nintendo DS version of MySims Kingdom, the player arrives at an island with a mysterious person making trees and houses vanish. The player's job is to stop this man and travel the whole of the Nintendo DS Kingdom to do this. This version of MySims Kingdom includes both characters from other MySims games and some unique to MySims Kingdom.

Reception

MySims Kingdom was nominated for Best Simulation Game for the Wii by IGN in its 2008 video game awards. The review aggregator website Metacritic gave the Nintendo Wii version a score of 76 out of 100 and the Nintendo DS version a score of 58 out of 100.

References

External links
 Japanese Nintendo DS catalogue page

Electronic Arts games
The Sims
Wii games
Nintendo DS games
2008 video games
Video games developed in Japan
Life simulation games
Social simulation video games
Visceral Games
Single-player video games
Video games with alternative versions
Video games using Havok
Video games developed in the United States